The Mayo House is a historic house at 302 Elm Street in Marvell, Arkansas.  It is a -story wood-frame structure, clad in novelty siding, with a dormered hip roof.  It was built in 1917 by H. B. Mayo, the developer of this residential subdivision, and occupied by his family 1917–20.  The house is a locally distinctive rendition of Colonial Revival styling, with some Craftsman features.  The east-facing front has a full-width single-story porch which wraps around to the north side, and is supported by seven fluted metal columns.

The house was listed on the National Register of Historic Places in 1997.

See also
National Register of Historic Places listings in Phillips County, Arkansas

References

Houses on the National Register of Historic Places in Arkansas
Colonial Revival architecture in Arkansas
Houses completed in 1917
Houses in Phillips County, Arkansas
National Register of Historic Places in Phillips County, Arkansas